Darryl McCray (born 1953), better known by his tagging name Cornbread, is an American graffiti writer from Philadelphia. He is widely considered the world's first modern graffiti artist. McCray was raised in Brewerytown, a neighborhood of North Philadelphia. During the late 1960s, he and a group of friends started doing graffiti in Philadelphia, by writing their monikers on walls across the city.   The movement spread to New York City and blossomed into the modern graffiti movement, which reached its peak in the U.S. in the late 1970s and early 1980s, and then spread to Europe. McCray later worked with the Philadelphia's Anti-Graffiti Network and Mural Arts Program to help combat the spread of graffiti in the city. He is currently a public speaker and a youth advocate.

Childhood and corrections facility 

Born in Brewerytown, Philadelphia in 1953, Darryl McCray was primarily raised by his mother and grandparents.  In 1965, McCray was sent to a juvenile corrections facility called the Youth Development Center (YDC). While at the YDC, McCray adopted the nickname "Cornbread". McCray complained to the cook of the institution, Mr. Swanson, that he only baked white bread, while McCray preferred his grandmother's cornbread. McCray's constant badgering inspired Mr. Swanson to start calling McCray "Cornbread", a nickname that McCray adopted. 

The YDC was full of Philadelphia gang members who would write their names on the walls of the facility. McCray claims he was never part of a gang, but he would write his new nickname, Cornbread, on the walls next to the gang members. McCray claimed to be the first person to tag his own name and not a gang name or symbol.

Tagging in the 1960s and 1970s 

When McCray was released from the YDC, he went to Strawberry Mansion Junior High School. There, he developed a crush on a girl named Cynthia Custuss. To win her attention, he wrote "Cornbread Loves Cynthia" all over North Philadelphia. After winning over Cynthia, he continued tagging North Philadelphia.

In 1971, Cornelius Hosey was shot dead in gang warfare, and Philadelphia newspapers incorrectly identified him as Cornbread, the tagger.
Cornbread then decided to make a captivating and unusual come back to win over media attention, after they falsely pronounced his death. He decided to 'bomb' the whole Philadelphia Zoo with his tag and finally wrote "Cornbread Lives" on a tame elephant that he had met a few days prior. Due to this, he was arrested and had to serve community service.

The Anti-Graffiti Network and Mural Arts 

In 1984, Mayor Wilson Goode founded the Anti-Graffiti Network and recruited McCray to help him stop the inner-city youth from tagging. The Anti-Graffiti Network eventually turned into Mural Arts Program, the largest public art program in the United States.

In 2011, a local mural tour in West Philadelphia called Love Letters drew its inspiration from 1967's "Cornbread Loves Cynthia".

Activist and icon 

In 2007, documentary filmmaker, Sean McKnight, made a film called Cry of the City Part 1: The Legend of Cornbread. The story of Cornbread is also prominently included in the documentary film about the history of graffiti, called Bomb It (2007). In August 2013, McCray was honored at the Graffiti Hall of Fame in East Harlem for his contribution to hip-hop culture.

Today, McCray works as a public speaker and youth advocate. He gives motivational talks about his youth as a tagger, his run-ins with the law, and his struggles with drugs.

In 2021, McCray married Consuela Sanchez, a longtime friend from Philadelphia.

References

1953 births
Living people
American graffiti artists
Artists from Philadelphia